Alexander William Bleeker (born July 28, 1986) is an American musician and guitarist. He is best known as the bassist of the American indie rock band Real Estate, with whom he has recorded four studio albums, and as the frontman and primary recording artist of the indie rock band Alex Bleeker and the Freaks. Grateful Dead drummer Bill Kreutzmann joined the Freaks onstage at Outside Lands in 2015. 

Bleeker's most recent release is Alex Bleeker and the Freaks' third studio album, Country Agenda.

Early life and personal life
Bleeker was born in New Jersey and raised in Ridgewood, New Jersey. He attended Ridgewood High School with two of his Real Estate bandmates, Martin Courtney and Matt Mondanile. After graduating from high school, he studied at Bennington College in Bennington, Vermont.  Bleeker currently resides in Bolinas, California.

Discography
with Real Estate
Real Estate (2009)
Days (2011)
Atlas (2014)
In Mind (2017)

with Alex Bleeker and the Freaks
Alex Bleeker and the Freaks (2009)
How Far Away (2013)
Country Agenda (2015)

Solo
These Days (7" Group Tightener, 2010)
From the Archives Vol. 1 (7" Modern Country Records, 2011)
Heaven On The Faultline (Night Bloom Records, 2021)

References

External links
 Official website
 Real Estate website

1986 births
Living people
Musicians from New Jersey
Bennington College alumni
American indie rock musicians
People from Ridgewood, New Jersey
Ridgewood High School (New Jersey) alumni
Place of birth missing (living people)
American rock bass guitarists
American male bass guitarists
Real Estate (band) members
21st-century American bass guitarists
21st-century American male musicians